The Django Software Foundation (DSF) is a 501(c)(3) non-profit organization that develops and maintains Django, a free and open source web application framework.

Malcolm Tredinnick Memorial Prize 

The DSF makes an annual award in honour of early Django contributor Malcolm Tredinnick, to the person who best exemplifies the spirit of Malcolm’s work - someone who welcomes, supports and nurtures newcomers; freely gives feedback and assistance to others, and helps to grow the community.

Past recipients 

 2013 Curtis Maloney
 2014 Django Girls
 2015 Russell Keith-Magee
 2016 Aisha Bello
 2017 Claude Paroz
 2018 Kojo Idrissa
 2019 Jeff Triplett
2020 Ken Whitesell

References

Free software project foundations in the United States